Christopher J. Patrick is a Canadian psychologist. He is Distinguished Research Professor and Director of Clinical Training in the Department of Psychology at Florida State University. He is noted for his research on psychopathy, and he formulated the triarchic model of psychopathy, which he first described in 2009. He is a past president of both the Society for Psychophysiological Research and the Society for the Scientific Study of Psychopathy. In 2013, he received the Lifetime Scientific Career Contribution Award from the Society for the Scientific Study of Psychopathy.

References

External links
Faculty page

Living people
University of British Columbia alumni
Florida State University faculty
Canadian psychologists
Clinical psychologists
Year of birth missing (living people)